Branik is a village in western Slovenia in the Municipality of Nova Gorica. Until 2011, Pedrovo was a hamlet of Branik.

Name
The name of the settlement was changed from Rihemberk (earlier Rifenberg, from German Reyfemberch, attested in 1274) to Branik in 1955. The name was changed on the basis of the 1948 Law on Names of Settlements and Designations of Squares, Streets, and Buildings as part of efforts by Slovenia's postwar communist government to remove German elements from toponyms. Rihemberk is still the name used for Branik Castle located above the village.

Climate
Branik is in the Branik Valley, which is part of the Vipava Valley, just beneath the Karst Plateau. The location provides a favourable climate for the growth of Mediterranean fruits, such as figs and peaches. The area is also renowned for its wines, especially Vitovska Garganja, Barbera, Merlot, and Chardonnay.

Church

The parish church in the settlement is dedicated to Saint Ulrich and belongs to the Diocese of Koper.

Notable natives and residents 
Nevin Birsa, poet
Rajko Bratož, historian
Ljudevit Furlani, translator and journalist
Simon Gregorčič, poet
Tjaša Iris, painter

See also
Gorizia and Gradisca
Austrian Littoral
Julian March
Wines of Slovenia
Villa Flora Artist in Residency Program

References

External links

Branik on Geopedia
Webpage of the village

Populated places in the City Municipality of Nova Gorica